M.O.L. is a video album by American heavy metal band Disturbed, released on DVD in 2002. It is a documentary showing the band while in studio and touring, and features interviews with members of the band. It also contains music videos and live performances of songs from Disturbed's debut album The Sickness. Two other songs are also included – a music video for the demo version of "Perfect Insanity" and a non-album track titled "A Welcome Burden", which later appeared on the 10th anniversary edition of The Sickness.

M.O.L. stands for Meaning of Life, a song from The Sickness. It is not featured on this DVD, except for in-between chapters, where it is briefly played in the background.

Track listing 
List of selectable tracks, both in produced video and live concert form, that are available:
"Want" (live)
"Conflict" (live)
"Stupify" (music video)
"Fear" (live)
"Voices" (music video)
"Droppin' Plates" (live)
"Shout 2000" (live)
"Down with the Sickness" (music video)
"The Game" (live)

Special features
Photo Shoot
"Perfect Insanity"
Band Origin
Worst Venue
In the Studio Part 1
In the Studio Part 2
"A Welcome Burden"
In the Studio Part 3
Fuzz
Mike
Dan
Concert & Audio Set Up

Personnel

Disturbed 
David Draiman – vocals
Dan Donegan – guitar
Steve "Fuzz" Kmak – bass
Mike Wengren – drums

Production 
Director – Nathan Cox
Producers – D.O.B., Matt Caltabiano, Angela Smith
Director (live performance) – Atom Rothlein
Producer (live performance) – Jennifer Rothlein
Producer (live music) – David May

Certifications

References 

2002 compilation albums
2002 live albums
2002 video albums
Disturbed (band) video albums
Live video albums
Music video compilation albums
Warner Records compilation albums
Warner Records live albums
Warner Records video albums